, also known as BroCon, is a Japanese novel series created by Atsuko Kanase, written by Takeshi Mizuno and Kanase, and illustrated by Udajo. It has been adapted into two PlayStation Portable video games by Idea Factory, a yonkoma manga series and an anime television series. The 12-episode anime aired between July and September 2013. It is animated by Brain's Base. Funimation acquired the North American streaming rights for the anime. Funimation released a "The Complete Series + OVA - Limited Edition Blu-ray & DVD" on March 8, 2016.

Plot
Ema Hinata (or later known as Ema Asahina) is the daughter of the famous ex-pat, Rintaro Hinata. One day, Ema finds out that her dad is going to remarry a successful clothing maker named Miwa Asahina. Rather than bothering them, she decides to move into the Sunrise Residence complex that is owned by Miwa. From there, she discovers that she has 13 stepbrothers. As time moves on, her stepbrothers develop feelings for her and compete in ways to win her heart when all Ema wants to have is a loving family. Can she make all of her 13 stepbrothers happy or will she only pick one of them? Ema has a pet squirrel named Juli that helps her when times are tough that only she and her new brother Louis can understand. She is faced with many challenges like finding out she is adopted and having to apply for college.

Characters

Main characters
 

The daughter of the well-known adventurer, Rintaro Hinata. She is 17 years old and a high school senior at Hinode High School. After her father remarries, she moves in with her 13 new stepbrothers. She is very good at cooking. Her father was always away working, leaving Ema to take care of herself, but now, with her new family, she feels happy and safe. She has a talking pet squirrel named Juli who is always saying that her new family is a pack of wolves and that she must always be well aware of her surroundings. Juli can only communicate with Ema and (as it is later revealed) Louis. Both Juli and Louis call Ema "Chi". It is later revealed that Ema is adopted, as her real parents had died. At first, this revelation causes a problem for Ema because her father had never told her. However, Louis helps her through this by sharing his own experience as an adoptee. Juli also reassures her of her father's love.

 The oldest son of the Asahina family, aged 31. He is a doctor who is well versed in medicine. However, he is more fainthearted than he seems, because he faints at the sight of blood. As a pediatrician, he loves children and is very good with them, carrying candy around in his pockets constantly for them, and shares a particularly close bond with the youngest brother, Wataru. He has looked after his younger brothers his whole life and would give anything for them.

 The second son of the Asahina family aged, 29. He is a successful lawyer and acts as the "mother figure" to the family. He cooks, cleans and helps the others study for school. He has is calm, reliable, and intelligent, but can also be very nit-picky and a perfectionist when it comes to cooking. He is also shown to be a little socially awkward at times. He always takes care of his brothers without fail or thanks, but sometimes disapproves of Kaname, Hikaru, and Tsubaki's irresponsible natures.

 The third son of the Asahina family, aged 27. He has the charms of a playboy, and a womanizing nature, but actually works as a Buddhist monk. The other brothers do not take him very seriously and Ukyo is frequently scolding him for his inappropriate behavior, but he can be much more responsible than his carefree nature suggests. In the game, Kaname helped Iori recover from the emotional trauma he suffered after the death of his girlfriend. Whenever Iori attempted to commit suicide, Kaname always came and stopped him.

 The fourth son of the Asahina family, aged 26. He is a novelist who likes watching his brothers' reactions around Ema. He had gone to Italy for a short time to gather material for his work and claims that he cross-dresses only for the sake of gathering information for his noir novels, finding that most people are more likely to open up to a beautiful woman. Hikaru is extremely clever and a bit manipulative. He seems to know that almost every one of his brothers has feelings toward Ema, and even makes an odds chart called "Brothers Conflict" as his hobby, keeping track of which brother seems most likely to win Ema in the end.

 The fifth son of the Asahina family and oldest of the triplets, aged 24. He is a voice actor alongside his identical twin, Azusa. He is cheeky and pushy, but is hard-working and passionate about his career. In episode 4, Tsubaki kisses Ema when he is depressed. He kisses her again in episode 6, as well as revealing his feelings for her. He and Azusa are practically never apart.

 The sixth son of the Asahina family and the second-oldest triplet, aged 24. Like his identical triplet brother Tsubaki, he is a voice actor. However, he is calmer and much less tenacious than Tsubaki and is usually the one to keep him in check. He is intelligent and talented, but feels like he relies on Tsubaki too much. In episode 8, after realizing his feelings for Ema, he confesses to her.

 The seventh son of the Asahina family and the youngest triplet, aged 24. Unlike Tsubaki and Azusa, he is a fraternal triplet. He works at the video game company that makes one of Ema's favorite video games - "Zombie Hazard". Unlike the rest of the brothers, he lives alone in a separate apartment. He has a blunt way of talking, but is very good at looking after others. He used to run track and be very athletic, which Subaru admired him greatly for, but gave that up in favor of a more stable career--something Subaru still resents him for. It is revealed in episode 9 that he has feelings for Ema. He has two cats named after his brothers, Tsubaki and Azusa.

 The eighth son of the Asahina family, aged 22. He works as a hairdresser. He is a beautiful and a mysterious man, always looking up at the clouds. He speaks slowly and never seems to be paying attention, but he still cares for his brothers. He is the only other person besides Ema who can communicate with Juli, and promises him that they will protect Ema. It is later revealed in the game and anime that Louis is adopted, and he is the one who helps Ema after she also finds out that she is adopted.

 The ninth son of the Asahina family who turned 20 in episode 2. He is a college sophomore and very athletic, and plays on the basketball team. He wants to play professionally and eventually is offered a chance to do so. He and Natsume used to be very close as fellow aspiring athletes, but when Natsume gave that up, Subaru resented him for it. They have not gotten along very well ever since. He has no understanding of girls and does not know how to deal with them. As a result, he often gets tense around Ema. He asks Ema out in episode 5.

 The tenth son of the Asahina family, aged 18. He is a high school senior at Bright Centrair Private Academy, works part-time at a cafe, and is known for his prince-like behavior. He is very popular, intelligent, and even well-known at other high schools. He is very accepting of Ema when she comes into the family. Iori has knowledge of all types of flowers and their meanings, tending the gardens at the mansion. He often gives Ema flowers relating to her current situation to help her feel better. In the game, he once had a girlfriend named Fuyuka, whom he loved very much. Unfortunately, Fuyuka was killed in a car accident right before Iori's eyes. He became suicidal and even attempted to strangle Kaname for preventing him from killing himself, but Ema is able to prevent this.

 The eleventh son of the Asahina family, aged 17. He is a senior high school student and also Ema's classmate. He has a righteous personality and hates anything to be incorrect. He is also a bit of a delinquent and hates math, but in the manga, he is shown to be good at soccer. He often gets into fights with Fuuto, despite his older brothers' reminders to be a more supportive older sibling. It is revealed in episode 2 that Yusuke was already having a crush on Ema ever since he met her at school, even before she became his sister. He was very confused and initially refused to accept her as his sister when she first joined the family.

 The twelfth son of the Asahina family, aged 15. He is a first year high school student and a very popular idol. He has a devilish and cheeky personality, and is very rude and bratty to his siblings. However, he can be very mature for his age, determined and passionate in his career. In episode 6, he transfers to Hinode High School, which shocks Ema and Yusuke. He loves to tease Ema about being his "beautiful idiot sister" and later develops romantic feelings towards her.

 The thirteenth and youngest son of the Asahina family, aged 10. He is in 5th grade. He is sweet and honest, but very spoiled by his over-protective brothers. He loves sweets and bunnies, since Masaomi made him a blue rabbit toy named "Usa-tan #0" that he always carries around with him. He can be very energetic and enjoys doing very impressive impressions of his older brothers. Since the brothers' father died, Masaomi has become his father figure, and Wataru often goes to him or Ukyo or Kaname for help with his homework.

Other characters

Ema's pet squirrel who has the ability to talk. However, he can only talk to Ema and Louis. He has been with Ema since she was young, always looking out for her and making sure none of the brothers (or "wolves", as he considers them) make a pass at her. He always calls Ema "Chi". Later in the anime, he appears to Ema in a dream as a handsome man in a suit and tells her about her adoption. He has a deeper voice in this form, and while in it he tells Ema that he loves her. Later in the anime, Ema begins to forget about Juli, including forgetting to bring him with her on a trip.

Ema and Yusuke's classmate at Hinode High School. He handles the cultural festival for their class.

Ema and Yusuke's classmate at Hinode High School. She is also Ema's best friend. She is a fan of Ema and Yusuke's brother, Futo. She teasingly addresses Yusuke as "Futo Asahina's brother", which annoys Yusuke.

Kaname's co-worker from Club Buddha. He is called "Chi" by Kaname.

Kaname's co-worker from Club Buddha. He gives advice to Ema in episode 10. He tells her that family love is true love, which means he understands her current situation.

Ema's adoptive father, Miwa's husband and stepfather of the Asahina brothers. He is a well-known adventurer who travels around the world.

The mother of the Asahina brothers, Rintaro's wife and Ema's stepmother. She is a full-time career woman who works overseas.

Kaori is a teacher at Hinode High School. She is the Homeroom teacher of Ema, Yuusuke, Mahoko and Kazuma.

Media

Manga
Brothers Conflict Purupuru is a manga spinoff of the light novel featuring the characters from the novel in chibi form. Brothers Conflict feat. Natsume tells the story in Natsume's point of view. Other manga that tell the story from other points of view, including Brothers Conflict feat. Yusuke & Futo and Brothers Conflict feat. Tsubaki & Azusa.

Brothers Conflict Short Stories is a compilation of all the short stories that were previously featured on Sylph and Dengeki Girl’s Style.

Anime

A 12-episode anime television series adaptation of Brothers Conflict was produced by Brain's Base and directed by Atsushi Matsumoto. It began airing on July 2, 2013. The opening theme is "BELOVED×SURVIVAL" by singer Gero who is famous on video-sharing website, Nico Nico Douga. The ending theme,"14 to 1", is by Asahina Bros.+Juli. The group is composed of Kazuyuki Okitsu, Daisuke Hirakawa, Junichi Suwabe, Nobuhiko Okamoto, Kenichi Suzumura, Kōsuke Toriumi, Tomoaki Maeno, Ken Takeuchi, Daisuke Ono, Daisuke Namikawa, Yoshimasa Hosoya, Kenn, Yūki Kaji and Hiroshi Kamiya. It was released in Japan on February 26, 2014 on DVD and Blu-ray alongside the special episode. In addition to streaming rights, Funimation released the series on Blu-ray and DVD on March 8, 2016.

References

External links
Official manga website 
Official video game website 
Official anime website 
 

2010 Japanese novels
ASCII Media Works manga
Kadokawa Dwango franchises
Idea Factory franchises
Brain's Base
Romantic comedy anime and manga
Male harem anime and manga
Harem video games
Otome games
Japan-exclusive video games
Funimation
NBCUniversal Entertainment Japan
PlayStation Portable games
PlayStation Vita games
Nintendo Switch games
2012 video games
2012 manga
Anime series
Video games based on novels
Video games developed in Japan
Television shows based on Japanese novels